Prof. Tara Murphy is an Australian Astrophysicist and CAASTRO (the ARC Centre of Excellence for All-sky Astrophysics) chief investigator working in the School of Physics at the University of Sydney. Murphy led a group that first confirmed radio emissions from the 2017 Neutron Star Merger event which provided evidence for a global scientific announcement in the field of gravitational waves.

Education 
Murphy completed a Bachelor of Science at the University of Sydney and a PhD (Astrophysics) at the University of Edinburgh.

Career 
In 2013, Murphy co-founded a start-up company called Grok Learning which promotes the easy learning of computational methods to high school students (and teachers).

During the global effort to record the 2017 Neutron Star Merger, Murphy led a group at the University of Sydney that confirmed the first radio signals of gravitational waves that were caused by two neutron stars colliding in a galaxy 130 million light-years from Earth. This discovery was made 15 days after these gravitational waves were first reported by an international team of scientists and astronomers.

In 2019, Murphy and their PhD student gathered data using the CSIRO's Australia Telescope Compact Array at Narrabri in New South Wales to observe radio emissions created by a shockwave from a mysterious cosmic 'cow' explosion, and potential birth of a black hole. Their findings suggested that there was a magnetar at the core of the supernova, and that this event was different from the typical supernova as there was energy that continued to power the explosion allowing the 'cow' to inexplicably become brighter with time.

Honours and recognition 

 2019 ARC Discovery Project: "Radio follow-up of gravitational wave events"
 2016 ARC Future Fellow: "The radio transient sky in real time"
 2012 Young Tall Poppy Award
 2011 ARC Discovery Project: "Extreme Events: Mining the Radio Sky for Gamma-ray Bursts with Intelligent Algorithms"
 2010 ARC Super Science: "New Dimensions in Radio Astronomy: Mining Sparse Datasets with the Australian SKA Pathfinder"

References 

Living people
Year of birth missing (living people)
University of Sydney alumni
Academic staff of the University of Sydney
Australian astrophysicists
21st-century Australian astronomers